The Slovenian women's national ice hockey team represents Slovenia at the International Ice Hockey Federation's IIHF World Women's Championships. The women's national team is controlled by Hokejska zveza Slovenije. As of 2011, Slovenia has 88 female players. The Slovenian women's national team is ranked 19th in the world.

Tournament record

Olympic record

The Slovenia women's team has never qualified for an Olympic tournament.

World Championship record
Slovenia debuted in the Women's world championship in 2000.

2000 – Finished 26th (5th in Division II, Demoted to Division III)
2001 – Finished 22nd (2nd in Division III)
2004 – Finished 23rd place (2nd in Division III)
2005 – Finished 21st place (1st in Division III, Promoted to Division II)
2007 – Finished 21st place (6th in Division II, Demoted to Division III)
2008 – Finished 23rd place (2nd in Division III)
2011 – Finished 23rd place (4th in Division III)
2012 – Finished 25th place (5th in Division IIA)
2013 – Finished 26th place (6th in Division IIA, Demoted to Division IIB)
2014 – Finished 28th place (2nd in Division IIB)
2015 – Finished 27th place (1st in Division IIB, Promoted to Division IIA)
2016 – Finished 25th place (5th in Division IIA)
2017 – Finished 25th place (5th in Division IIA)
2018 – Finished 26th place (5th in Division IIA)
2019 – Finished 23rd place (1st in Division IIA, Promoted to Division IB)
2020 – Cancelled due to the COVID-19 pandemic
2021 – Cancelled due to the COVID-19 pandemic
2022 – Finished 22nd place (6th in Division IB, Demoted to Division IIA)

Team

Current roster
The roster for the 2022 IIHF Women's World Championship Division I Group B tournament.

Head coach: Franc FerjaničAssistant coaches: Boštjan Kos, Aleš Sila

References

External links

IIHF profile
National Teams of Ice Hockey

Ice hockey
Women's national ice hockey teams in Europe